Baghdadeh (also Romanized as Baghdādeh; also known as Bagdâde, Baghdād, and Baghdadi) is a village in Ayask Rural District, in the Central District of Sarayan County, South Khorasan Province, Iran. At the 2006 census, its population was 1,661, in 406 families.

References 

Populated places in Sarayan County